) is a North Korea-aligned Korean international school in Toyoake, Aichi Prefecture, Japan, in the Nagoya metropolitan area. , the principal is Hwang In-suk.

, many students are officially stateless(Due to them being assigned the Chōsen-seki); some of them are South Korean citizens and some are naturalized Japanese citizens. Overall most students are fourth and/or fifth generation Zainichi Koreans. As of the same year, students who are close to graduating take trips to North Korea.

Notable alumni

 Jong Tae-se (football/soccer player)

References

External links
 Aichi Korean Middle and High School 

Schools in Aichi Prefecture
North Korean schools in Japan
Toyoake, Aichi